Ptilonyssus is a genus of mites in the family Rhinonyssidae. There are at least 230 described species in Ptilonyssus.

Species
These 230 species belong to Ptilonyssus, a genus of mites in the family Rhinonyssidae.

Ptilonyssus species

 Ptilonyssus acanthopneustes Stanyukovich & Butenko, 2003
 Ptilonyssus acrocephali Fain, 1964
 Ptilonyssus afroturdi Fain, 1962
 Ptilonyssus agelaii Fain & Aitken, 1967
 Ptilonyssus ailuroedi Domrow, 1964
 Ptilonyssus alaudae (Butenko & Stanyukovich, 2001)
 Ptilonyssus amarali Fain, 1964
 Ptilonyssus amazonicus Fain, 1972
 Ptilonyssus ammomani Stanyukovich & Butenko, 2003
 Ptilonyssus andropadi Fain, 1956
 Ptilonyssus angrensis (Castro, 1948)
 Ptilonyssus angustirostris Fain & Aitken, 1968
 Ptilonyssus anthi Stanyukovich & Butenko, 2003
 Ptilonyssus astridae Fain, 1956
 Ptilonyssus aureliani Fain, 1956
 Ptilonyssus balimoensis Sakakibara, 1968
 Ptilonyssus belemensis Fain & Aitken, 1968
 Ptilonyssus bombycillae Fain, 1972
 Ptilonyssus bradypteri (Fain, 1962)
 Ptilonyssus buloloensis Sakakibara, 1968
 Ptilonyssus cacici Fain, 1964
 Ptilonyssus calamocichlae Fain, 1963
 Ptilonyssus calandrellae (Bregetova, 1967)
 Ptilonyssus callinectoides (Brooks & Strandtmann, 1960)
 Ptilonyssus calvaria Knee, 2008
 Ptilonyssus camptostoma Hyland & Moorhouse, 1970
 Ptilonyssus capensis Zumpt & Till, 1955
 Ptilonyssus capitatus (Strandtmann, 1956)
 Ptilonyssus carduelis Fain, 1962
 Ptilonyssus cerchneis Fain, 1957
 Ptilonyssus cercomacrae Fain & Aitken, 1970
 Ptilonyssus certhiae Fain & Bafort, 1963
 Ptilonyssus certhiaxicola Fain, 1964
 Ptilonyssus certhilaudae Fain, 1972
 Ptilonyssus chalybaedomesticae Amaral, 1967
 Ptilonyssus chiroxiphiae Fain & Aitken, 1970
 Ptilonyssus chloris Fain, 1962
 Ptilonyssus chlorocichlae Fain, 1956
 Ptilonyssus chloropsicola Fain, 1966
 Ptilonyssus cinnyricincli Fain, 1962
 Ptilonyssus cinnyris Zumpt & Till, 1955
 Ptilonyssus cisticolarum Fain, 1959
 Ptilonyssus coccothraustis Fain & Bafort, 1963
 Ptilonyssus colluricinclae Domrow, 1964
 Ptilonyssus colopteryx Fain & Aitken, 1971
 Ptilonyssus condylocoxa Fain & Lukoschus, 1979
 Ptilonyssus conopophagae Fain & Aitken, 1970
 Ptilonyssus conopophilae Fain & Lukoschus, 1979
 Ptilonyssus corcoracis Domrow, 1969
 Ptilonyssus corvi Pence, 1972
 Ptilonyssus corythopicola Fain & Aitken, 1970
 Ptilonyssus cractici Domrow, 1964
 Ptilonyssus cyanosylviae Butenko & Lavrovskaya, 1980
 Ptilonyssus daptrii Fain, 1966
 Ptilonyssus degtiarevae Dimov & Mironov, 2012
 Ptilonyssus dendrocittae (Sakakibara & Strandtmann, 1968)
 Ptilonyssus dendrocolapticola Fain & Aitken, 1968
 Ptilonyssus desfontainei Zumpt & Till, 1955
 Ptilonyssus diadori Butenko & Lavrovskaya, 1980
 Ptilonyssus dicaei Domrow, 1966
 Ptilonyssus dicruri Fain, 1956
 Ptilonyssus dimi Dimov, 2020
 Ptilonyssus dioptrornis Fain, 1956
 Ptilonyssus dolicaspis Feider & Mironescu, 1980
 Ptilonyssus domrowi Feider & Mironescu, 1980
 Ptilonyssus donatoi Pereira & Castro, 1949
 Ptilonyssus dryoscopi Zumpt & Till, 1955
 Ptilonyssus echinatus Berlese & Trouessart, 1889
 Ptilonyssus elaeniae Fain & Aitken, 1967
 Ptilonyssus elbeli (Strandtmann, 1960)
 Ptilonyssus elongatus Fain, 1964
 Ptilonyssus emberizae Fain, 1956
 Ptilonyssus enicuri Fain & Nadchatram, 1962
 Ptilonyssus enriettii Castro, 1948
 Ptilonyssus eremophilae Butenko & Lavrovskaya, 1980
 Ptilonyssus estrildicola Fain, 1959
 Ptilonyssus euroturdi Fain & Hyland, 1963
 Ptilonyssus faini (Strandtmann, 1960)
 Ptilonyssus fluvicolae (Fain & Aitken, 1967)
 Ptilonyssus formicarii Fain & Aitken, 1970
 Ptilonyssus fringillae Fain & Sixl, 1971
 Ptilonyssus fringillicola Fain, 1959
 Ptilonyssus gerygonae Domrow, 1967
 Ptilonyssus gilcolladoi Ubeda, Rodriguez, Guevara & Rojas, 1989
 Ptilonyssus gliciphilae Domrow, 1966
 Ptilonyssus grallinae Domrow, 1964
 Ptilonyssus gressitti (Baker & Delfinado, 1964)
 Ptilonyssus harko Dimov, 2020
 Ptilonyssus hirsti (de Castro & Pereira, 1947)
 Ptilonyssus hiyodori Kadosaka, Kaneko & Asanuma, 1987
 Ptilonyssus hoffmannae Luz-Zamudio, 1984
 Ptilonyssus hoseini (Fain & Aitken, 1967)
 Ptilonyssus hylophylax Fain & Aitken, 1970
 Ptilonyssus hypocnemoides Fain & Aitken, 1970
 Ptilonyssus icteridius Strandtmann & Furman, 1956
 Ptilonyssus indicatoris Fain, 1957
 Ptilonyssus inflatipalpus Fain & Aitken, 1970
 Ptilonyssus inornatus Fain & Aitken, 1968
 Ptilonyssus insularis Cerny, 1969
 Ptilonyssus intermedius (Hirst, 1922)
 Ptilonyssus isakovae Butenko & Lavrovskaya, 1983
 Ptilonyssus japuibensis Fain & Aitken, 1970
 Ptilonyssus langei Butenko, 1972
 Ptilonyssus lanii Zumpt & Till, 1955
 Ptilonyssus lobatus Strandtmann, 1960
 Ptilonyssus lovottiae Dimov & Mironov, 2012
 Ptilonyssus ludovicianus Cerny, 1969
 Ptilonyssus lusciniae (Fain, 1962)
 Ptilonyssus lymozemae Domrow, 1965
 Ptilonyssus macclurei Fain, 1963
 Ptilonyssus madagascariensis Gretillat, Capron & Brygoo, 1959
 Ptilonyssus malacoptilae (Fain & Aitken, 1971)
 Ptilonyssus malaysiae Fain, 1964
 Ptilonyssus maluri Domrow, 1965
 Ptilonyssus mariacastroae Fain, 1961
 Ptilonyssus melanocoryphae (Bregetova, 1967)
 Ptilonyssus meliphagae Domrow, 1964
 Ptilonyssus melissae Spicer, 1977
 Ptilonyssus melittophagi Fain, 1956
 Ptilonyssus microecae Domrow, 1966
 Ptilonyssus mimi George, 1961
 Ptilonyssus mironovi Dimov, 2012
 Ptilonyssus missimensis Sakakibara, 1968
 Ptilonyssus monarchae Domrow, 1969
 Ptilonyssus montifringillae Butenko & Lavrovskaya, 1983
 Ptilonyssus morofskyi Hyland, 1963
 Ptilonyssus motacillae Fain, 1966
 Ptilonyssus muscicapae Bregetova, 1970
 Ptilonyssus muscicapoides Butenko & Lavrovskaya, 1980
 Ptilonyssus myiobii Fain & Aitken, 1970
 Ptilonyssus myrmotherulae Fain & Aitken, 1968
 Ptilonyssus myzanthae Domrow, 1964
 Ptilonyssus myzomelae Domrow, 1965
 Ptilonyssus nadchatrami Fain, 1964
 Ptilonyssus neochmiae Domrow, 1969
 Ptilonyssus nicatoris Fain, 1958
 Ptilonyssus nivalis Knee, 2008
 Ptilonyssus novaeguineae (Hirst, 1921)
 Ptilonyssus nucifragae (Hirst, 1923)
 Ptilonyssus nudus Berlese & Trouessart, 1889
 Ptilonyssus ohioensis Fain & Johnston, 1966
 Ptilonyssus olaoi Pereira & Castro, 1949
 Ptilonyssus orientalis (Ewing, 1933)
 Ptilonyssus orioli Fain, 1956
 Ptilonyssus orthonychus Domrow, 1969
 Ptilonyssus paradisaeus (Sakakibara, 1968)
 Ptilonyssus paranensis (Castro, 1948)
 Ptilonyssus pari Fain & Hyland, 1963
 Ptilonyssus pastoris Butenko, 1972
 Ptilonyssus pericrocoti (Sakakibara, 1967)
 Ptilonyssus perisorei George, 1961
 Ptilonyssus phainopeplae George, 1961
 Ptilonyssus philemoni Domrow, 1964
 Ptilonyssus phyllastrephi Zumpt & Till, 1955
 Ptilonyssus phylloscopi Fain, 1962
 Ptilonyssus pinicola Knee, 2008
 Ptilonyssus pipromorphae Fain & Aitken, 1967
 Ptilonyssus pirangae (Cerny, 1969)
 Ptilonyssus pittae Domrow, 1964
 Ptilonyssus platypsaris Fain & Aitken, 1971
 Ptilonyssus platyrhinchus Fain & Aitken, 1970
 Ptilonyssus plesiotypicus Knee, 2008
 Ptilonyssus ploceanus Fain, 1956
 Ptilonyssus poriazovi Dimov, 2020
 Ptilonyssus prunellae Fain & Bafort, 1963
 Ptilonyssus psalidoprocnei Fain, 1956
 Ptilonyssus psaltriparus Spicer, 1978
 Ptilonyssus pseudothymanzae Fain & Lukoschus, 1979
 Ptilonyssus psophodae Domrow, 1964
 Ptilonyssus ptyonoprognes Butenko & Lavrovskaya, 1983
 Ptilonyssus pycnonoti Fain, 1963
 Ptilonyssus pygiptilae Fain & Aiken, 1971
 Ptilonyssus pygmaeus (Bregetova, 1967)
 Ptilonyssus pyriglenae Fain & Aitken, 1968
 Ptilonyssus pyrrhulinus Stanyukovich & Butenko, 2003
 Ptilonyssus rabelloi (Castro, 1948)
 Ptilonyssus radovskyi Feider & Mironescu, 1980
 Ptilonyssus reguli Fain & Sixl, 1969
 Ptilonyssus rhipidurae Domrow, 1966
 Ptilonyssus richmondenae George, 1961
 Ptilonyssus ripariae Stanyukovich & Butenko, 2003
 Ptilonyssus ruandae Fain, 1963
 Ptilonyssus sairae Castro, 1948
 Ptilonyssus salpinctis George, 1961
 Ptilonyssus saltator Fain & Aitken, 1971
 Ptilonyssus schoenobaeni Fain, Sixl & Moritsch, 1974
 Ptilonyssus schumili Butenko & Lavrovskaya, 1980
 Ptilonyssus sclateriae Fain & Aitken, 1970
 Ptilonyssus sclerurus Fain & Aitken, 1970
 Ptilonyssus serini Fain, 1956
 Ptilonyssus setosae Domrow, 1969
 Ptilonyssus sialiae George, 1961
 Ptilonyssus sittae Fain, 1965
 Ptilonyssus souzai Pereira & Castro, 1949
 Ptilonyssus sphecotheris Domrow, 1964
 Ptilonyssus spini Stanyukovich & Butenko, 2003
 Ptilonyssus spinosus (Brooks & Strandtmann, 1960)
 Ptilonyssus steganurae Fain, 1967
 Ptilonyssus sternostomicus Fain & Aitken, 1968
 Ptilonyssus stomioperae Domrow, 1966
 Ptilonyssus strandtmanni Fain, 1956
 Ptilonyssus stresemanni Vitzthum, 1935
 Ptilonyssus struthideae Domrow, 1969
 Ptilonyssus sturnopastoris Fain, 1963
 Ptilonyssus sylviicola Stanyukovich & Butenko, 2003
 Ptilonyssus tachycinetae George, 1961
 Ptilonyssus terenotricci Fain & Aitken, 1970
 Ptilonyssus teretristis Cerny, 1969
 Ptilonyssus terpsiphonei Fain, 1956
 Ptilonyssus thamnomanes Fain & Aitken, 1970
 Ptilonyssus thamnophili Fain & Aitken, 1967
 Ptilonyssus thryothori Pence, 1972
 Ptilonyssus thymanzae Domrow, 1964
 Ptilonyssus tillae Fain, 1959
 Ptilonyssus toxostomae Pence, 1972
 Ptilonyssus traubi Strandtmann, 1960
 Ptilonyssus travassosfilhoi (Castro, 1948)
 Ptilonyssus triscutatus (Vitzthum, 1935)
 Ptilonyssus troglodytis Fain, 1964
 Ptilonyssus trouessarti pseudotrouessarti Sakakibara, 1968
 Ptilonyssus viduicola Fain, 1962
 Ptilonyssus vireonis (Dusbabek, 1969)
 Ptilonyssus vossi Spicer, 1977
 Ptilonyssus walterberghi Fain, 1958
 Ptilonyssus werneri (Castro, 1948)
 Ptilonyssus wilsoni Sakakibara, 1967
 Ptilonyssus xenops Fain & Aitken, 1968
 Ptilonyssus xyphorhynchus Fain & Aitken, 1970
 Ptilonyssus zeferinoi Amaral, 1968
 Ptilonyssus zumpti Fain, 1956

References

Rhinonyssidae
Articles created by Qbugbot
Acari genera